Six ships of the Royal Navy have been called HMS Imogen or HMS Imogene. A seventh was planned but never built:

  was an 18-gun sloop, originally the French privateer Diable-a-Quatre. She was captured in 1800 and foundered in 1805.
  was a 16-gun brig-sloop launched in 1805 and sold in 1817.
  was a 28-gun sixth rate, originally named HMS Pearl, but renamed in 1826 and launched in 1831. She was burnt by accident in 1840.
 HMS Imogene was to have been a wooden screw corvette, ordered in 1861 but cancelled in 1863.
  was a Coastguard vessel launched in 1864. She was renamed HMS Argus in 1884 and was sold in 1903. 
  was an iron screw yacht, formerly the Jacamar, built in 1882 by Barclay, Curle & Co, Glasgow. She was purchased in 1882, renamed HMS Impey in 1919 and was sold later that year.
  was an  launched in 1936 and sunk in a collision in 1940. 

Royal Navy ship names